Claro Mayo Recto Jr. (born Claro Recto y Mayo; February 8, 1890 – October 2, 1960) was a Filipino politician, jurist, and poet. He is remembered for his nationalism, for "the impact of his patriotic convictions on modern political thought", and has been seen in the same class as Dr. Jose Rizal, Sen. Jose W. Diokno, and Sen. Lorenzo Tañada.

Early life

Recto was born in Tiaong, Tayabas (now known as Quezon province), Philippines, of educated, upper middle-class parents, Claro Recto Sr. of Rosario, Batangas, and Micaela Mayo of Lipa, Batangas. He studied Latin at Instituto de Rizal in Lipa, Batangas, from 1900 to 1901. He continued his education at Colegio del Sagrado Corazón of Don Sebastián Virrey and finished his secondary education in 1905 at the age of 15, back when schools had lesser years to complete and finishing early was common. He moved to Manila to study at Ateneo de Manila where he consistently obtained outstanding scholastic grades, graduating with a Bachelor of Arts degree maxima cum laude in 1909. He received a Masters of Laws degree from the University of Santo Tomás. He later received his Doctor of Laws (Honoris Causa) honorary degree from Central Philippine University in 1969.

Political career

Recto launched his political career as a legal adviser to the first Philippine Senate in 1916. In 1919, he was elected representative from the second district of Batangas. He served as minority floor leader for several years until 1925. He travelled to the United States as a member of the Independence Mission and was admitted to the American Bar in 1924. Upon his return, he founded the Partido Democrata.

In 1928, Recto temporarily retired from active politics and dedicated himself to the practice and teaching of law. Soon thereafter, however, he found the world of academia restrictive and soporific. Although he still engaged in the practice of law, he resigned from his teaching job in 1931 and reentered politics. He ran and won a senate seat and was subsequently elected majority floor leader in 1934. He was appointed Associate Justice of the Supreme Court from July 3, 1935, to November 1, 1936, by President Franklin Delano Roosevelt.

As a jurist, he debated against U.S. President Dwight D. Eisenhower's Attorney General Herbert Brownell Jr.
on the question of U.S. ownership of military bases in the Philippines, a question that remained unresolved for 40 years.

Recto presided over the assembly that drafted the Philippine Constitution in 1934–35 in accordance with the provisions of the Tydings–McDuffie Act and a preliminary step to independence and self-governance after a 10-year transitional period. The Tydings–McDuffie Act was written to replace the Hare–Hawes–Cutting Act which, through the urging of Manuel L. Quezon, was rejected by the Philippine Senate. The original bill would have allowed the indefinite retention of U.S. military and naval bases in the Philippines and the American imposition of high tariffs and quotas on Philippine exports such as sugar and coconut oil. After amendments, the Tydings–McDuffie bill was passed and signed into law by President Roosevelt.

Together with then-Senate President Quezon, who later was elected the first president of the Commonwealth of the Philippines, Recto personally presented the Commonwealth Constitution to U.S. President Roosevelt. The consensus among many political scholars of today judges the 1935 Constitution as the best-written Philippine charter ever in terms of prose.

In 1941, Recto ran and reaped the highest number of votes among the 24 elected senators. He was re-elected in 1949 as a Nacionalista Party candidate and again in 1955 as a guest candidate of the Liberal Party.

Recto served as Commissioner of Education (1942–43), Minister of Foreign Affairs (1943–44), and Cultural Envoy with the rank of Ambassador on a cultural mission to Europe and Latin America (1960).

In the 1953 and 1955 elections, Recto denounced the influence and coercion of the Catholic Church on voters' decisions—the Philippines having a 90% Catholic majority at the time. In a 1958 article in "The Lawyer's Journal," Recto suggested a constitutional amendment to make the article on Separation of Church and State clearer and more definitive. He also argued against the teaching of religion in public schools.

Recto foresaw the demands of a fast-moving global economy and the challenges it would pose to his nation. In a memorable speech on the eve of the 1957 presidential election when he ran against then President Carlos Garcia, he petitioned all sectors of society, and following the example of Rizal, implored Philippine youth:
The first task to participate seriously in the economic development of our country (is to) pursue those professions for which there is a great need during an era of rapid industrialization. Only a nationalistic administration can inspire a new idealism in our youth, and with its valid economic program make our youth respond to the challenging jobs and tasks demanding full use of their talents and energies.

Recto was defeated in the election, winning just 8 percent of the vote. Since his time, subsequent administrations practiced with fidelity and enthusiasm what he called "subservience and colonial mentality," most of them with greed and rapacious intents. To the judgment of Recto and many political gurus, colonial mentality towards America by the sycophant Philippine government, and its evil twin—servility to the almighty dollar, are among the major contributories to graft and corruption, which in turn have paralyzed the nation's economy.

In 1991, Philippine president Corazon Aquino initially fought for the continuation of the Republic of the Philippines - U.S. Bases Treaty, but ultimately acquiesced to the will of the people, and the Philippine Senate rejected its renewal. In September 1991, by a slim majority led by Senator Jovito Salonga, the lawmaking body rescinded the agreement.

Recto the Jurist

Recto was known as an abogado milagroso (lawyer of miracles), a tribute to his many victories in the judicial court. He wrote a three-volume book on civil procedures, which, in the days before World War II was standard textbook for law students.

His prominence as a lawyer paralleled his fame as a writer. He was known for his flawless logic and lucidity of mind in both undertakings. He served the wartime cabinet of President José P. Laurel during the Japanese occupation. Together with Laurel, Camilo Osías, and Quintín Paredes, he was taken into custody by the American colonial government and tried for treason. In his defense, in his treatise entitled "Three Years of Enemy Occupation" (1946), he convincingly presented the case of patriotic conduct of Filipinos during World War II. He fought his legal battles and was acquitted.

Poet, playwright, essayist

He was reared and schooled in the Spanish language, his mother tongue alongside Tagalog, and he was also fluent in English. He initially gained fame as a poet while a student at University of Santo Tomás when he published a book Bajo los Cocoteros (Under the Coconut Trees, 1911), a collection of his poems in Spanish. A staff writer of El Ideal and La Vanguardia, he wrote a daily column, Primeras Cuartillas (First Sheets), under the pen name "Aristeo Hilario." They were prose and numerous poems of satirical pieces. Some of his works still grace classic poetry anthologies of the Hispanic world.

Among the plays he authored were La Ruta de Damasco (The Route to Damascus, 1918), and Solo entre las sombras (Alone among the Shadows, 1917), lauded not only in the Philippines, but also in Spain and Latin America. Both were produced and staged in Manila to critical acclaim in the mid-1950s.

In 1929, his article Monroismo asiático (Asiatic Monroism) validated his repute as a political satirist. In what was claimed as a commendable study in polemics, he proffered his arguments and defenses in a debate with Dean Máximo Kálaw of the University of the Philippines where Kálaw championed a version of the Monroe Doctrine with its application to the Asian continent, while Recto took the opposing side. The original Monroe doctrine (1823) was U.S. President James Monroe's foreign policy of keeping the Americas off-limits to the influence of the Old World, and states that the United States, Mexico, and countries in South and Central America were no longer open to European colonization. Recto was passionately against its implementation in Asia, wary of Japan's preeminence and its aggressive stance towards its neighbors.

In his deliberation, he wrote about foreseeing the danger Japan posed to the Philippines and other Asian countries. His words proved prophetic when Japan invaded and colonized the region, including the Philippines from 1942 to 1945.

His eloquence and facility with the Spanish language were recognized throughout the Hispanic world. The Enciclopedia Universal says of him: "Recto, more than a politician and lawyer, is a Spanish writer, and that among those of his race" (although he had Irish and Spanish ancestors), "there is not and there has been no one who has surpassed him in the mastery of the language of his country's former sovereign."

The "finest mind of his generation"

Recto was referred to by some as the "finest mind of his generation". Through his speeches and writings, he was able to mold the mind of his Filipino contemporaries and succeeding generations, a skill "only excelled by (Jose) Rizal's".

Teodoro M. Locsín of Philippines Free Press, defined Recto's genius:
Recto is not a good speaker, no. He will arouse no mob. But heaven help the one whose pretensions he chooses to demolish. His sentences march like ordered battalions against the inmost citadel of the man's arguments, and reduce them to rubble; meanwhile his reservations stand like armed sentries against the most silent approach and every attempt at encirclement by the adversary. The reduction to absurdity of Nacionalista senator Zulueta's conception of sound foreign policy was a shattering experience, the skill that goes into the cutting of a diamond went into the work of demolition. There was no slip of the hand, no flaw in the tool. All was delicately, perfectly done... Recto cannot defend the indefensible, but what can be defended, he will see to it that it will not be taken.

Criticism

His critics or fellow historians claim that Recto's brilliance is overshadowed by his inability to capture nationwide acceptance. His lack of popularity frequently saw him at the bottom of senate votes, and he sometimes lost the senate elections. Even leftist groups and Maoists in the 1970s criticized him for being too much of an elitist. He was seen as out of touch with the poor, and only garnered less than nine percent of votes when he ran for president in 1957. He could have been an exceptional leader, perhaps a great president, but his appeal was limited to the intellectual elite and the nationalist minority of his time, though others argued that he was just too ahead of his time. In the same article, political editorialist, Manuel L. Quezon III, laments this fact:

Recto's leadership was the curious kind that only finds fulfillment from being at the periphery of power, and not from being its fulcrum. It was the best occupation suited to the satirist that he was. His success at the polls would be limited, his ability to mold the minds of his contemporaries was only excelled by Rizal's...But he was admired for his intellect and his dogged determination to never let the opposition be bereft of a champion, still his opposition was flawed. For it was one that never bothered to transform itself into an opposition capable of taking power.

However, one possible explanation as to why Recto was never able to capture full national acceptance was because he dared to strongly oppose the national security interests of the United States in the Philippines, as when he campaigned against the US military bases in his country. During the 1957 presidential campaign, the Central Intelligence Agency (CIA) conducted black propaganda operations to ensure his defeat, including the distribution of condoms with holes in them and marked with `Courtesy of Claro M. Recto' on the labels.

Death

Recto died of a heart attack in Rome, Italy, on October 2, 1960, while on a cultural mission, and en route to Spain, where he was to fulfill a series of speaking engagements.

The U.S. Central Intelligence Agency is suspected of involvement in his death. Recto, who had no known heart disease, met with two mysterious "Caucasians" wearing business suits before he died.  that a plan to murder Recto with a vial of poison was discussed by CIA Chief of Station Ralph Lovett and the US Ambassador to the Philippines Admiral Raymond Spruance years earlier.

Recto was married twice. He had four children in his first marriage with Angeles Silos. He also had two sons with his second wife, Aurora Reyes. He is the grandfather of current senator Ralph Recto.

Speeches and Writings
A realistic economic policy for the Philippines. Speech delivered at the Philippine Columbian Association, September 26, 1956. ISBN B0007KCFEM
Sovereignty and Nationalism
On the Formosa Question, 1955 ISBN B0007JI5DI

United States-Philippine Relations, 1935-1960. Alicia Benitez, ed. University of Hawaii, 1964.
Three years of enemy occupation: The issue of political collaboration in the Philippines. Filipiniana series, 1985 Filipiana reprint. ISBN B0007K1JRG
Our trade relations with the United States, 1954 ISBN B0007K8LS6
The evil of religious test in a democracy, 1960 ISBN B0007K4Y8W
Solo entre las sombres: Drama en un acto y en prosa, 1917; reprinted 1999 
Asiatic monroeism and other essays: Articles of debate, 1930 ISBN B0008A5354
The law of belligerent occupation and the effect of the change of sovereignty on the commonwealth treason law: With particular reference to the Japanese occupation of the Philippines, 1946
Our lingering colonial complex, a speech before the Baguio Press Association, 1951
The Quirino junket: an Objective Appraisal, 1949 ISBN B0007K4A7W
The Philippine survival: Nationalist essays by Claro M. Recto, 1982
Claro Recto on our Constitution, Constitutional Amendments and the Constitutional Convention of 1991
Our mendicant foreign policy, a speech at the commencement exercises, University of the Philippines, 1951
The Recto Valedictory, a collection of 10 never-delivered speeches, with English translations by Nick Joaquin, 1985
[1] [2] Vintage Recto: Memorable speeches and writings, edited by Renato Constantino, 1986
Recto Reader: Excerpts from the Speeches of Claro M. Recto. edited by Renato Constantino, 1965 ISBN B0006E72Z6

Further reading

The relevant Recto, by Renato Constantino, 1986
Dissent on Philippine Society; the Filipino elite; Recto's Second Demise, by Renato Constantino, 1972
The Relevance of Recto Today: A review of Philippine-American and other relations, by Emerenciana Avellana
Recto and the National Democratic Struggle: a re-appraisal, by Jose Sison, 1969
Claro M. Recto, 1890-1990: A Centenary tribute of the Civil Liberties Union, 1990
The Crisis of a Republic by Teodoro Agoncillo, University of the Philippines Press, Quezon City.
White Love, Surveillance and Nationalist Resistance in the United States Colonization of the Philippines by Vicente L. Rafael
The Star-Entangled Banner: One Hundred Years of America in the Philippines by Sharon Delmondo, 2004
 Nationalism: a summons to greatness by Lorenzo M. Tañada; edited by Ileana Maramag, 1965
 Cory Aquino: Person of the Century by Manuel L. Quezon III, Philippines Free Press, December 30, 1999.

See also
 List of Philippine legislators who died in office

References

External links
 
https://web.archive.org/web/20070927121038/http://www.quezon.ph/thecolumn.php?which=9
https://web.archive.org/web/20060224152312/http://www.abs-cbnnews.com/storypage.aspx?StoryId=29698
http://www.bookrags.com/biography/claro-m-recto/
https://web.archive.org/web/20070707163850/http://www.manilatimes.net/national/2006/feb/10/yehey/opinion/20060210opi5.html
http://www.senate.gov.ph/senators/former_senators//claro_recto.htm
http://www.mb.com.ph/issues/2006/03/14/OPED2006031458608.html
https://web.archive.org/web/20070420193107/http://www.rizalcanada.org/Pages/PermanentPages/ArticleRizalBill.html
A note on Recto's play by Nick Joaquin
the institutional invisibility of American imperialism, the Philippines and Filipino Americans

1890 births
1960 deaths
Ateneo de Manila University alumni
Central Philippine University people
Central Philippine University alumni
Associate Justices of the Supreme Court of the Philippines
Candidates in the 1957 Philippine presidential election
Filipino collaborators with Imperial Japan
20th-century Filipino judges
Filipino writers
Secretaries of Foreign Affairs of the Philippines
Minority leaders of the Senate of the Philippines
Senators of the 4th Congress of the Philippines
Senators of the 3rd Congress of the Philippines
Senators of the 2nd Congress of the Philippines
Senators of the 1st Congress of the Commonwealth of the Philippines
Senators of the 10th Philippine Legislature
Senators of the 9th Philippine Legislature
Members of the House of Representatives of the Philippines from Batangas
Nacionalista Party politicians
People from Quezon
People from Lipa, Batangas
Writers from Batangas
People acquitted of treason
Claro
Tagalog people
Spanish-language writers of the Philippines
University of Santo Tomas alumni
Laurel administration cabinet members
Burials at the Manila North Cemetery